Miniimonas is a Gram-positive, rod-shaped and non-motile genus of bacteria from the family of Beutenbergiaceae, which has been isolated from sea sand.

References

Micrococcales
Bacteria described in 2011
Monotypic bacteria genera